Hap or HAP may refer to:

People 
 Hap (nickname)
 Phạm Hạp (died 979), a general of the Đinh dynasty of Vietnam
 Helmut Andreas Paul HAP Grieshaber (1909-1981), German artist
 Henry Augustus Pearson Torrey (1837–1902), American professor of philosophy

HAP 
 Hazardous Air Pollutant
 Health Australia Party, a political party
 High-altitude platform
 Hospital-acquired pneumonia
 Hospital and Healthsystem Association of Pennsylvania
 Housing Authority of Portland
 Humanitarian Accountability Partnership
 Hydroxylapatite (HAp), a mineral
 Hypoxia-activated prodrug
 Rights and Justice Party, a Turkish political party

Other uses
 "Hap" (poem), in Thomas Hardy's Wessex Poems and Other Verses
 Apis (Egyptian mythology)
 Haplochromine cichlids
 hap, ISO 639-3 code for the Hupla language of the Indonesian New Guinea Highlands
 Tiger HAP, a helicopter
 , a cultivar of Karuka
 Hap (file format) for HarmonyOS specific apps built on DevEco Studio IDE

See also
 Haps (disambiguation)